Velislav may refer to:
 Velislav, Burgas Province, a village in Bulgaria
 Velislav, a Slavic given name; notable people include:
 Velislav the Canon, 14th-century notary, the commissioner of the Velislaus Bible
 Velislav Vasilev, Bulgarian football player
 Velislav Vutsov, Bulgarian football manager

See also 
 Veleslav